Visa Debit is a major brand of debit card issued by Visa in many countries around the world. Numerous banks and financial institutions issue Visa Debit cards to their customers for access to their bank accounts. In many countries the Visa Debit functionality is often incorporated on the same plastic card that allows access to ATM and any domestic networks like EFTPOS or Interac.

Usage
In many countries the Visa Debit functionality has been added to existing ATM cards to allow customers to use the card for internet and point of sales transactions.

Australia
Bendigo Bank issued the first Visa Debit card in 1982, more than two decades before Mastercard Debit, or widespread Visa Debit use in Australia. Today it is in wide issuance, and domestically switches over local networks, though for new banks, connection to Visa is permitted.

Canada

In Canada, virtually all domestic debit card transactions are processed over the Interac network, though several financial institutions have also permitted PIN-based ATM transactions internationally over the Visa-owned Plus Network. However, Interac's dominance has left little room for alternative debit networks such as Visa or MasterCard to be used for domestic transactions.

Several Canadian financial institutions that primarily offer credit cards through the Visa network – including CIBC, RBC, Scotiabank, and TD – currently offer Visa Debit, either through a dual-network co-branded card which also works on Interac (CIBC, Scotia and TD), or as a "virtual" card used alongside the customer's existing Interac debit card (RBC). Both options ensure customers can perform point-of-sale transactions or ATM withdrawals as usual via Interac, but use the Visa network to process online, phone, and international transactions, none of which are well-supported by Interac. (The latter does have its own online payment service, Interac Online, which co-branded Visa cards are not eligible for.)

For the dual-network cards, in-person transactions within Canada are processed on the Interac network, but international transactions, as well as online and phone orders through Canadian retailers, are processed through the Visa network. (However, Canadian retailers must specifically allow for Visa Debit transactions, even if they already accept Visa credit cards.) "Virtual Visa Debit" works similarly; customers use their existing Interac debit cards for in-person transactions (and Interac Online) in Canada, but are also provided with a secondary "virtual" Visa card (i.e. card number, expiry, and CVV2) which can be used for online and phone transactions (but not point-of-sale, in Canada or internationally).

Although Visa floated the prospect of competing directly with Interac in regards to point-of-sale transactions in 2009, there has been no indication since 2010 that it is continuing to pursue this option.

Germany 

Germany's banking industry strongly favours its proprietary Girocard technology that can be co-branded with Maestro or V-Pay, but not with the more powerful Debit MasterCard or Visa Debit.

However, over the course of the last years, certain financial institutions such as Consorsbank and ING-DiBa have started issuing cards that are linked to a checking account but use the Visa protocols. These cards allow free cash withdrawals on ATMs owned by other banks; the issuing banks absorb the fees of the Visa network.

Greece 

In Greece Piraeus Bank and Alpha Bank offer Visa Debit cards to their customers as an option, having updated from the Visa Electron cards that they used to offer.

Ireland 

Many Irish banks, such as Permanent TSB, are now issuing Visa Debit cards to their current account customers as the domestic Laser scheme, usually co-badged with Maestro, was abandoned in the early 2010s.

Israel 
In Israel, Visa Debit only launched in April 2015, and is only offered to Bank Leumi customers via its subsidiary Leumi Card, now MAX. The bank used to issue debit cards under the Visa Electron brand prior to losing its controlling interest at ICC credit company on 2000.

Italy 

In Italy the first Visa Debit branded card was issued by FinecoBank as their default option for debit cards, starting from 2016. All new customers cards (and cards due to renewal) will be replaced by a Visa Debit card co-branded with the national Bancomat network.

Philippines 

In the Philippines, major banks like BDO, Unionbank, Landbank, EastWest Bank, UCPB and DBP are the major issuers of Visa Debit. All of the three major state-owned banks issue Visa debit cards as well their subsidiaries like the Overseas Filipino Bank.

Most Visa Debit cards are connected to the national interbank network BancNet and is the primary network for most over-the-counter transaction.

Romania

The Visa Debit are - along with Debit MasterCard - the most issued debit cards in Romania.

Visa entered in the Romanian market in 1996 (26 years ago), the first debit cards issued by Visa in Romania were Visa Electron, but now most of them were replaced by Visa Debit and it's variant Visa Classic.

United Kingdom

The first debit card in the United Kingdom was launched by Barclays in June 1987 under the "Connect" brand. NatWest followed with the "Switch" debit card in October 1988. Connect was later merged into Visa.

The Visa Debit card was previously known as "Visa Delta" solely in the UK. The Delta name began to be phased out in favor of the Visa Debit branding from September 1998.

United States
Numerous banks issue Visa-branded debit cards linked to accounts. Some issuing banks call their cards "Visa check cards". Cards allow for purchases at any merchant where any type of Visa card is accepted. Transactions are processed one of three ways. A signed transaction is processed through the regular Visa credit network. PIN-based transactions, including ATM withdrawals, are processed through the Visa-owned Plus, Interlink networks or other regional networks such as STAR. Many retailers allow cashback with PIN-based transactions. Also, in line with other credit and debit purchases, transactions under $25 are exempt from requiring signatures or PINs.

Market competition 
Among numerous competitors to Visa Debit in the debit card market are Mastercard's Maestro and Debit cards, as well as Visa's V Pay cards in Europe. Local domestic debit cards also compete. In addition to the above, China's UnionPay, India's RuPay, and Japan's JCB Co., Ltd. are competitive as well. In a few countries, such as the United States, American Express is still another competitor.

References

Debit cards
Debit card issuer associations
Visa Inc.